Kenneth Scott (born 16 June 1964) is a Scottish solicitor and former cricketer.

Scott was born in June 1964 at Dechmont, West Lothian. He was educated at Linlithgow Academy, before matriculating to the University of Dundee. He graduated from Dundee with honours and began his legal training in the city, before working as a solicitor at Fife and Edinburgh. A club cricketer for both West Lothian Cricket Club and Watsonians Cricket Club, Scott made his debut for Scotland against Nottinghamshire in a List A one-day match at Glasgow in the 1985 Benson & Hedges Cup. He played one-day cricket for Scotland until 1988, making eight appearances in the Benson & Hedges Cup. Playing as a batsman in the Scottish side, he scored 121 runs in his eight matches at an average of 15.12, with a highest score of 34. In addition to playing one-day cricket for Scotland, Scott also made a single first-class appearance against Ireland at Coleraine in 1987. Batting twice in the match as an opening batsman, he was dismissed for 33 runs in the Scotland first innings by Hugh Milling, while in their second innings he was unbeaten on 14, with the match ending in a draw.

References

External links
 

1964 births
Living people
People from Dechmont
People educated at Linlithgow Academy
Alumni of the University of Dundee
Scottish solicitors
Scottish cricketers